The Vercelli Synagogue is a synagogue in Vercelli, Italy.

The synagogue, located at Via Foà 70, was built in 1878. It was designed by Marco Treves, an architect born in Vercelli who also designed the Great Synagogue of Florence.

The Moorish Revival synagogue features red-and-white masonry courses and a flat, tripartite facade with a raised central portion, that resembles a number of other European and American synagogues with designs inspired by Vienna's Leopoldstädter Tempel, by architect Ludwig Förster.

A major restoration project was launched in 2007.

On 23 November 2013, in an antisemitic act, two swastikas were found sprayed on its walls.

References

Moorish Revival synagogues in Italy
Orthodox synagogues in Italy
Synagogues completed in 1878
Buildings and structures in Vercelli
Synagogues in Piedmont
Italki Jews topics